The Taipei Metro Qizhang station (formerly transliterated as Chichang Station until 2003) is a station on the Songshan–Xindian line located in Xindian District, New Taipei, Taiwan. It is a transfer and terminus of the Xiaobitan branch line.

Station overview

This two-level, underground station, has two side platforms and two exits. Trains on the Xiaobitan branch line and Songshan–Xindian line utilize the same platforms.

Station layout

References

Railway stations opened in 1999
1999 establishments in Taiwan
Songshan–Xindian line stations